The Lao People's Revolutionary Youth Union is a mass organisation in Laos, dedicated to mobilising young people throughout the country with a view to contributing to national development. It is the youth wing of the Lao People's Revolutionary Party, the ruling party of Laos.

Originating in 1955 as the Youth Combatant Association and now comprising some 243,500 registered members (aged 15–35), the Lao People's Revolutionary Youth Union has a particular focus on the fields of information, media, entertainment, art and music. The LPRYU operates at central, provincial, municipal, district and village levels and co-operates with foreign countries and international organisations in a wide range of programme activities. LRPYU has a Print and Electronic Media Department which publishes Nok Hien Bin magazine and the Noum Lao newspaper, while also making television and radio programmes for young people.

See also
Politics of Laos
History of Laos since 1945

References 
Laos: Cultural Profile
humantrafficking.org

External links

Lao People's Revolutionary Party
Youth organizations based in Laos
Youth wings of communist parties
Youth organizations established in 1955
1955 establishments in Laos